The Civil defense of the GDR was an organization for the protection of the population, the economy, vital facilities and cultural values against the consequences of disasters and accidents. In the event of war, it should also serve to protect its own population from military operations.

Leadership

References

Military of East Germany
Military tactics